Manhunt is an American drama anthology television series created by Andrew Sodroski, Jim Clemente, and Tony Gittelson, initially commissioned as a television miniseries. The first season, Manhunt: Unabomber, stars Sam Worthington and Paul Bettany, and depicts a fictionalized account of the FBI's hunt for the Unabomber. It premiered on Discovery Channel on August 1, 2017. On July 17, 2018, Charter Communications was in advanced negotiations with the series' producers to pick up the series for two additional seasons to be aired on their Spectrum cable service. The show's second season follows the hunt for Eric Rudolph, who was the perpetrator of the Centennial Olympic Park bombing, after suspicion initially fell on security guard Richard Jewell. The second season, Manhunt: Deadly Games, premiered on February 3, 2020.

Cast

Unabomber

Main

Sam Worthington as Jim Fitzgerald
Paul Bettany as Ted Kaczynski
Jeremy Bobb as Stan Cole 
Keisha Castle-Hughes as Tabby Milgrim
Lynn Collins as Natalie Rogers
Brían F. O'Byrne as Frank McAlpine 
Elizabeth Reaser as Ellie Fitzgerald 
Ben Weber as Andy Genelli 
Chris Noth as Don Ackerman

Recurring

Jane Lynch as Janet Reno 
Katja Herbers as Linda Kaczynski 
Michael Nouri as Bob Guccione 
Jill Remez as Susan Mosse
Wallace Langham as Louis Freeh
Brian d'Arcy James as Henry Murray
Mark Duplass as David Kaczynski
Diesel Madkins as Ernie Esposito 
Will Murden as Sean Fitzgerald 
Carter and Colby Zier as Ryan Fitzgerald 
Jana Allen as Heidi Shumway 
Trieste Kelly Dunn as Theresa Oakes
Griff Furst as Burkhardt
Rebecca Henderson as Judy Clarke
Bonnie Johnson as Wanda Kaczynski 
Steve Coulter as Anthony Bisceglie 
Mary Rachel Dudley as Lois Epstein 
Tyler Huth as Timmy Oakes 
Doug Kruse as David Gelernter
Mike Pniewski as Charles Epstein
Gregory Alan Williams as Garland Burrell
McKenna Grace Martin as Joanna Epstein

Deadly Games

Main

Cameron Britton as Richard Jewell
Jack Huston as Eric Rudolph
Judith Light as Bobi Jewell
Carla Gugino as Kathy Scruggs
Gethin Anthony as Jack Brennan
Kelly Jenrette as Stacy Knox
Arliss Howard as Earl Embry

Recurring
Jay O. Sanders as Watson Bryant
Nick Searcy as Sheriff Thompson
Marley Shelton as Hannah Gray
Becky Ann Baker as Patricia Rudolph
Brad William Henke as Big John

Episodes

Season 1: Unabomber (2017)

Season 2: Deadly Games (2020)

Production
The working title for the series was Manifesto, and the series order was announced in March 2016 at a presentation by Discovery Communications president Rich Ross. On May 15, 2016, Entertainment Weekly released several promotional photos, showing a first look at Paul Bettany's portrayal of Ted Kaczynski.

Release
Lionsgate Home Entertainment released the entire miniseries on Blu-ray and DVD on December 26, 2017.

Netflix secured the rights to the series in November 2017. It premiered on the site on December 12, 2017, in various territories.

CBS acquired the broadcast rights to Deadly Games in August 2020, where it premiered on September 21, 2020. In December 2020, Deadly Games was added to Netflix.

Reception
The review aggregator website Rotten Tomatoes reported a 93% approval rating and an average rating of 7.67/10, based on 29 reviews. The site's critics consensus reads: "Engrossing and affecting, Manhunt: Unabomber uses a taut, meticulously constructed narrative to uncover the facts behind the oft-exaggerated true story." On Metacritic, the series has a weighted average score of 71 out of 100, based on 19 critics, indicating "generally favorable reviews."

Historical accuracy

Season 1
Former FBI agent Greg Stejskal was involved in the UNABOM investigation, and he criticized the writers of the show in TheWrap, accusing them of making "a minor member" of the FBI investigative team "into the star player who won the game," referring to the show's portrayal of Jim Fitzgerald. He said that Fitzgerald never met Kaczynski, was not in Lincoln, Montana, during the time of Kaczynski's arrest (although the show does not place Fitzgerald in Lincoln at the time of Kaczynski's arrest), had no part in the search of Kaczynski's cabin, and never interviewed him.

Fitzgerald told Bustle Magazine in August 2017 that the show is in the "high 80 percentile" of accuracy, though "the Fitz character is a composite." He also stated that he had not interviewed Kaczynski, although he said that he was on his way to do so in 2007 when Kaczynski changed his mind.

References

Further reading

External links
 

2010s American drama television miniseries
2017 American television series debuts
English-language television shows
Discovery Channel original programming
Spectrum Originals original programming
Cultural depictions of mathematicians
Television shows filmed in Pittsburgh